Rifle Range (Malay: Padang Tembak) is a residential neighbourhood within the city of George Town in Penang, Malaysia. Formerly a shooting range used by the British Army, low-cost flats were constructed within the area to provide affordable housing for the urban poor.

Etymology 
Rifle Range was so named as the area was once used as a shooting range by the British Army and local police.

History 
Rifle Range, which was used by the military and the police as a shooting range during the British colonial era, was also the site where victims of the Imperial Japanese Army's Sook Ching massacres were buried. During World War II, when Penang was under Japanese occupation, thousands of ethnic Chinese were brutally executed by the Japanese authorities and were buried in mass graves throughout Penang, including at Rifle Range. The remains of the victims would only be uncovered in the 1960s, when the construction of the Rifle Range flats was underway.

In 1964, the Malaysian federal government approved a pilot project to construct prefabricated high-rise housing at Rifle Range. Six blocks of 17-storey flats and three blocks of 18-storey flats, which cumulatively contain 3,699 residential units and 66 shop lots, were to be assembled on-site using prefabricated concrete blocks. The construction of the flats, Penang's first low-cost high-rise housing project, was undertaken by the Penang Development Corporation. The flats were completed in the 1970s.

Transportation 
The major thoroughfares within the neighbourhood are Boundary Road and Rifle Range Road. In addition, Rapid Penang bus routes 201, 202 and 204 include stops within Rifle Range. These routes are complemented by Rapid Penang's Congestion Alleviation Transport (CAT) Air Itam route, a free-of-charge transit service within Air Itam.

Education 
The neighbourhood is served by a single primary school.
 SRK Padang Tembak

See also 
 Air Itam

References 

Neighbourhoods in George Town, Penang